Robert Kurbaša (born 13 October 1977) is a Croatian actor.

Filmography

Television roles 
 Ruža vjetrova as Srđan Matošić (2011-2012)
 Pod sretnom zvijezdom as Vedran Gallo (2011)
 Dnevnik plavuše as Toni (2010-2011)
 Dolina sunca as Andrija Bukovac (2009-2010)
 Ponos Ratkajevih as Cvijo (2008)
 Ne daj se, Nina as David Glowatzky (2007-2008)
 Urota as Tomislav Vojković (2007)
 Obični ljudi as Robert Knežević (2006-2007)
 Ljubav u zaleđu as Duje Kaliterna (2005-2006)
 Naša kućica, naša slobodica as Mislav (1999)

Movie roles 
 7 seX 7 as Kazimir (2011)
 Ljubavni život domobrana as Gogo (2009)
 Najveća pogreška Alberta Einsteina as Marko (2006)
 The Miroslav Holding Co. as student #3 (2001)

Notes

External links

1977 births
Living people
20th-century Croatian male actors
Croatian male stage actors
Croatian male film actors
Croatian male television actors
Actors from Split, Croatia
21st-century Croatian male actors